Łukasz Adrian Rzepecki (born 5 September 1992) is a Polish parliamentarian.

Graduate of the University of Łódź, he was the Chief of Staff to Marcin Mastalerek and a legislative assistant to Janusz Wojciechowski. Subsequently, he was secretary of the Law and Justice in the Łódź region and chairman of the regional structures of the Law and Justice Youth Forum.

In 2010 he was elected a councilor in Ozorków, and in 2014 successfully ran for councilor in Łódź. In 2015 Polish parliamentary elections Rzepecki was elected to Sejm, representing Law and Justice. He is the youngest parliamentarian elected in these elections. In October 13 he joined the Kukiz'15 parliamentary club after being banished from PiS.

References

1992 births
Living people
Law and Justice politicians
Members of the Polish Sejm 2015–2019
Councillors in Łódź